Worms is an electoral constituency (German: Wahlkreis) represented in the Bundestag. It elects one member via first-past-the-post voting. Under the current constituency numbering system, it is designated as constituency 206. It is located in eastern Rhineland-Palatinate, comprising the city of Worms, the district of Alzey-Worms, and southern parts of the Mainz-Bingen district.

Worms was created for the inaugural 1949 federal election. Since 2013, it has been represented by Jan Metzler of the Christian Democratic Union (CDU).

Geography
Worms is located in eastern Rhineland-Palatinate. As of the 2021 federal election, it comprises the independent city of Worms, the district of Alzey-Worms, and the Verbandsgemeinden of Bodenheim, Rhein-Selz, and Sprendlingen-Gensingen from the Mainz-Bingen district.

History
Worms was created in 1949. In the 1949 election, it was Rhineland-Palatinate constituency 10 in the numbering system. In the 1953 through 1976 elections, it was number 157. In the 1980 through 1998 elections, it was number 155. In the 2002 election, it was number 209. In the 2005 election, it was number 208. In the 2009 and 2013 elections, it was number 207. Since the 2017 election, it has been number 206.

Originally, the constituency comprised the city of Worms, and the districts of Landkreis Worms and Alzey as well as the Amtsgerichtsbezirk of Oppenheim from the Landkreis Mainz district. In the 1972 through 2013 elections, it comprised the city of Worms, the district of Alzey-Worms, and the Verbandsgemeinden of Bodenheim, Guntersblum, and Nierstein-Oppenheim from the Mainz-Bingen district. It acquired its current borders in the 2017 election.

Members
The constituency has been held by the Social Democratic Party (SPD) during all but two Bundestag terms since its creation. It was first represented by Willy Müller from 1949 to 1969. He was succeeded by Willi Fischer from 1969 to 1980. Gernot Fischer then served two terms, followed by Florian Gerster from 1987 to 1994. Klaus Hagemann was representative from 1994 to 2013. Jan Metzler of the Christian Democratic Union (CDU) was elected in 2013, and re-elected in 2017 and 2021.

Election results

2021 election

2017 election

2013 election

2009 election

References

Federal electoral districts in Rhineland-Palatinate
1949 establishments in West Germany
Constituencies established in 1949
Worms, Germany
Alzey-Worms
Mainz-Bingen